José Fernando Marín Abizanda (born 27 November 1971) is a Spanish former professional footballer who played in La Liga for CD Logroñés. He is the father of Pablo Marín.

Career
Marín made his senior debut for CD Logroñés in La Liga on March 5, 1995 against Athletic Club de Bilbao. The following season on 19 May 1996, during the 1995–96 Segunda División campaign, Marin provided the assist for Logroñés top scorer that season Manel to open the scoring in a 2-1 victory away against CD Toledo at the Estadio Salto del Caballo in the match which secured promotion back to La Liga for his side who were at that time managed by Juande Ramos.

Marín had joined Club Deportivo Logroñés as a young player and has said that he had supported the club as a child. He stated he would have stayed there his whole career but had to join Club Deportivo Badajoz in 2000 in order to help Logroñés with their spiralling debts (which would eventually bankrupt the club in 2009). He would return to the club and became club captain during his time at Logroñés, and in total made over 200 league appearances over 3 separate spells; 1994 - 2000, 2002 - 2004, and 2005 - 2007, and in doing so had the distinction to become the only player ever in the club's history to feature for the team in all four top Spanish divisions: First, Second, Second B and Third.

Personal life
His son Pablo Marin is also a professional footballer who made his La Liga debut for Real Sociedad in October 2022.

References

1971 births
Living people
Sportspeople from Logroño
Spanish footballers
Footballers from La Rioja (Spain)
Association football defenders
Association football midfielders
La Liga players
Segunda División players
Tercera División players